Russell Morash (born February 11, 1936) is an American television producer and director. Morash's many television programs are produced through WGBH and airing on PBS.

Early life 
Morash is a native of Lexington, Massachusetts. Morash's father was a builder.

Education 
In 1957, Morash graduated from the Boston University College of Fine Arts.

Career 
Morash started his entertainment career as a cameraman for Boston public-television station WGBH-TV. In 1961, as a cameraman, Morash met Julia Child when she appeared on a WGBH program called I've Been Reading, while promoting her cookbook Mastering the Art of French Cooking. Viewers flooded the station with calls and letters asking to see more. The French Chef premiered on WGBH in 1962 and then was distributed nationally by American Public Television. Morash began directing The French Chef in 1963. They worked together on other cooking shows for more than thirty years.

Morash's theater-inspired directorial style, and the technology of the day, required that the staff and host — all collected in a makeshift studio cobbled together with equipment that had escaped a massive station fire — would shoot each episode in one take. It established an in-the-moment template for a new kind of public television show that Morash took with him to launch other series, such as This Old House and The Victory Garden.

The Victory Garden and This Old House spinoff series The New Yankee Workshop were filmed in Morash's own backyard in Massachusetts.

Filmography 
 1955 MIT Science Reporter - Director, producer
 1962-1966 The French Chef - Director, producer

Personal life 
Morash's wife is Marian Morash, a James Beard Award-winning chef who also appeared on Julia Child's cooking show, appeared on The Victory Garden and edited The Victory Garden Cookbook.

Portrayals 
Fran Kanz plays Morash in the 2022 HBO Max series Julia with Sarah Lancashire.

References

External links
 This Old House
 
 Boston Globe article

1936 births
Living people
American television directors
Television producers from Massachusetts
Boston University College of Fine Arts alumni
People from Lexington, Massachusetts
This Old House